Molar Massif is a large mountain massif immediately east of the Lanterman Range in the Bowers Mountains of Antarctica. It was mapped by the United States Geological Survey from ground surveys and U.S. Navy air photos, 1960–1964. The descriptive name was applied by the Advisory Committee on Antarctic Names; when viewed in plan, the outline of the massif resembles a molar tooth.

Features 
Geographical features include:

 Canine Hills
 Dentine Peak
 Evison Glacier
 Husky Pass
 Incisor Ridge
 Leap Year Glacier
 Tobogganers Icefall
 Wisdom Hills

Further reading 
 Gunter Faure, Teresa M. Mensing, The Transantarctic Mountains: Rocks, Ice, Meteorites and Water, P 136
 Edmund Stump, The Ross Orogen of the Transantarctic  Mountains, P 49

External links 

 Molar Massif on USGS website
 Molar Massif on AADC website
 Molar Massif on SCAR website

References 

Mountains of Victoria Land
Pennell Coast